The 1956–57 Western Kentucky State Hilltoppers men's basketball team represented Western Kentucky State College (now known as Western Kentucky University) during the 1956-57 NCAA University Division Basketball season. The Hilltoppers were led by future Naismith Memorial Basketball Hall of Fame coach Edgar Diddle. One of the highlights of the season was a victory over 2nd ranked San Francisco at the newly opened Freedom Hall dedication. Western finished tied for the Ohio Valley Conference championship, however, the NCAA tournament bid went to co-champion, Morehead State. Ralph Crosthwaite and Owen Lawson were named to the All-Conference Team.

Schedule

|-
!colspan=6| Regular Season

|-

References

Western Kentucky Hilltoppers basketball seasons
Western Kentucky State
Western Kentucky State Basketball, Men's
Western Kentucky State Basketball, Men's